The Asticou Azalea Garden in Northeast Harbor, Maine, United States, is a popular visitor attraction. It was created by lifelong resident of the village, Charles Kenneth Savage, in 1956. Much of the initial plant collection originated at Reef Point Estate in nearby Bar Harbor, the summer residence of renowned landscape architect Beatrix Farrand. The collection was moved  with the financial assistance of John D. Rockefeller Jr., including the weeping hemlock, just north of the main bridge.

Located at the intersection of Route 198 and Route 3 (Peabody Drive), the  garden and its pond are open to the public during daylight hours from May 1 to October 31. It features a selection of rhododendrons and azaleas, including the Rhododendron canadense, Maine's native azalea. Styled after a Japanese stroll garden, the fine-gravel paths are raked regularly in a manner that suggests flowing water. There is also a sand garden, where this effect is repeated but with the addition of stones, which are meant to represent islands.

Savage was also the owner of the Asticou Inn, which is located on the opposite side of Peabody Drive. Prior to the establishment of the garden, the Savage children and grandchildren had made a treehouse and rope swing in the white pine still standing today. The present-day pond was formerly surrounded by an alder swamp.

Group photographs for weddings at the inn are often taken in the Garden.

Gallery

Notes

References
Mount Desert Land & Garden Preserve. "Asticou Azalea Garden"

External links
Asticou Azalea Garden at the Mount Desert Land & Garden Preserve's website
The New York Times review of the Garden

Northeast Harbor, Maine
Mount Desert Island
Gardens in Maine
Tourist attractions in Hancock County, Maine
1956 establishments in Maine
Japanese gardens in the United States
Japanese strolling gardens
Protected areas of Hancock County, Maine